Forensic Files is an American documentary series which reveals how forensic science is used to solve violent crimes, mysterious accidents, and even outbreaks of illness.  The show is broadcast on truTV, narrated by Peter Thomas, and produced by Medstar Television, in association with truTV Original Productions. It has broadcast 406 episodes since its debut on TLC in 1996 as Medical Detectives.  The HLN channel broadcasts new episodes once a week.

Episodes
{| class="wikitable plainrowheaders" style="margin:auto;width:100%;"
|-
! scope="col" style="background-color:#FFCC99;" | No. inseries
! scope="col" style="background-color:#FFCC99;" | No. inseason
! scope="col" style="background-color:#FFCC99;" | Title
! scope="col" style="background-color:#FFCC99;" | Original air date

|}

References

External links
 Forensic Files episodes on TV Guide

04